Chihiro Kato (加藤 千尋 Kato Chihiro, born 22 November 1988) is a Japanese volleyball player who plays for JT Marvelous.

Profile
She became a volleyball player at 9 years old.

Clubs
Kanagawa Prefectural Yamatominami High School → JT Marvelous (2007-)

Awards

Team 
2009-2010 V.Premier League -  Runner-Up, with JT Marvelous.
2010 59th Kurowashiki All Japan Volleyball Tournament -  Runner-Up, with JT Marvelous.
2010-11 V.Premier League -  Champion, with JT Marvelous.
2011 60th Kurowashiki All Japan Volleyball Tournament -  Champion, with JT Marvelous.

National team
 2005 Youth national team Asian youth volleyball competition
 2006-2007 Junior national team - Asian junior volleyball competition (2006), World junior volleyball competition (2007)
 2008 - 1st AVC Women's Cup

References

External links
JVA Biography
JT Official Website

1988 births
Living people
People from Fujisawa, Kanagawa
Japanese women's volleyball players
JT Marvelous players